Pharmacis is a genus of moths of the family Hepialidae. There are eight described species found in Eurasia.

Species
Pharmacis aemilianus - Italy
Pharmacis anselminae - Italy
Pharmacis bertrandi - France
Pharmacis carna - Central and eastern Europe
Pharmacis castillanus - Spain
Pharmacis claudiae - Italy
Pharmacis fusconebulosa (map-winged swift) - Eurasia
Recorded food plants: Polystichum, Pteridium, Solanum
Pharmacis pyrenaicus - France

External links
Hepialidae genera

Hepialidae
Exoporia genera
Taxa named by Jacob Hübner